For these animals, there is documented evidence of homosexual behavior of one or more of the following kinds: sex, courtship, affection, pair bonding, or parenting, as noted in researcher and author Bruce Bagemihl's 1999 book Biological Exuberance: Animal Homosexuality and Natural Diversity.

Bagemihl writes that the presence of same-sex sexual behavior was not "officially" observed on a large scale until the 1990s due to observer bias caused by social attitudes towards nonheterosexual people, making the homosexual theme taboo. Bagemihl devotes three chapters, "Two Hundred Years at Looking at Homosexual Wildlife", "Explaining (Away) Animal Homosexuality" and "Not For Breeding Only" in his 1999 book Biological Exuberance to the "documentation of systematic prejudices" where he notes "the present ignorance of biology lies precisely in its single-minded attempt to find reproductive (or other) 'explanations' for homosexuality, transgender, and non-procreative and alternative heterosexualities." Petter Bøckman, academic adviser for the Against Nature? exhibit, stated "[M]any researchers have described homosexuality as something altogether different from sex. They must realize that animals can have sex with who they will, when they will and without consideration to a researcher's ethical principles." Homosexual behavior is found amongst social birds and mammals, particularly the sea mammals and the primates.

Sexual behavior takes many different forms, even within the same species and the motivations for and implications of their behaviors have yet to be fully understood. Bagemihl's research shows that homosexual behavior, not necessarily sex, has been documented in about five hundred species as of 1999, ranging from primates to gut worms. Homosexuality in animals is seen as controversial by social conservatives because it asserts the naturalness of homosexuality in humans, while others counter that it has no implications and is nonsensical to equate natural animal behaviors to morality. Sexual preference and motivation is always inferred from behavior. Thus homosexual behavior has been given a number of terms over the years. The correct usage of the term homosexual is that an animal exhibits homosexual behavior, however this article conforms to the usage by modern research, applying the term homosexuality to all sexual behavior (copulation, genital stimulation, mating games and sexual display behavior) between animals of the same sex.



Mammals

Selected mammals from the full list

Baboon
Bison
Bonobo
Brown bear
Brown Rat
Cavy 
Caribou
Cat (domestic)
Cattle (domestic)
Chimpanzee
Common dolphin
Common marmoset
Dog
Dolphin
Elephant
Fox
Giraffe
Goat
Horse (domestic)
Human
Koala
Lion
Orca
Panda

Birds

Selected birds from the full list

Barn owl
Cassowary
Chicken
Common gull
Emu
House sparrow
Kestrel
King penguin
Mallard
Ostrich
Raven
Rock dove

Fish

Amazon molly
Anglerfish
Blackstripe topminnow
Bluegill sunfish
Char
Grayling
European bitterling
Green swordtail
Guiana leaffish
Houting whitefish
Jewel cichlid
Least darter (Microperca punctulata)
Mouthbreeding fish sp.
Salmon spp.
Southern platyfish
Ten-spined stickleback
Three-spined stickleback

Reptiles

The all-female Whiptail lizard species Aspidoscelis neomexicanus (center), which reproduces via parthenogenesis, is shown flanked by two sexual species having males, A. inornatus (left) and A. tigris (right). Research has shown that simulated mating behavior increases fertility for Aspidoscelis neomexicanus. One female lies on top of another, playing the role of the male, the lizard that was on bottom has larger eggs, in most cases. The lizards switch off this role each mating season.

Anole sp.
Bearded dragon
Blue-tailed day gecko (Phelsuma cepediana)
Broad-headed skink
Checkered whiptail lizard
Chihuahuan spotted whiptail lizard
Common ameiva
Common garter snake
Cuban green anole
Desert grassland whiptail lizard
Desert tortoise
Fence lizard
Five-lined skink
Gold dust day gecko (Phelsuma laticauda)
Gopher (pine) snake
Green anole
Inagua curlytail lizard
Jamaican giant anole
Laredo striped whiptail lizard
Largehead anole
Mourning gecko
Plateau striped whiptail lizard
Red diamond rattlesnake
Red-tailed skink
Seychelles giant tortoise
Side-blotched lizard
Speckled rattlesnake
Water moccasin
Western rattlesnake (Crotalus viridis)
Western banded gecko
Whiptail lizard spp.
Wood turtle
Blue-tongued skink

Amphibians

Appalachian woodland salamander
Black-spotted frog
Mountain dusky salamander
Tengger desert toad

Insects

Male homosexuality has been inferred in several species of dragonflies. A survey of damsel and dragonflies reveals characteristic cloacal pincher mating damage in 20–80 percent of the males, indicating a fairly high occurrence of sexual coupling between males.

Alfalfa weevil
Australian parasitic wasp sp.
Bean weevil sp.
Bedbug and other bug spp.
Blister beetle spp.
Blowfly
Broadwinged damselfly sp.
Cabbage (small) white (butterfly)
Checkerspot butterfly
Club-tailed dragonfly spp.
Cockroach spp.
Codling moth
Common skimmer dragonfly spp.
Creeping water bug sp.
Cutworm
Digger bee
Dragonfly spp.
Eastern giant ichneumon wasp
Eucalyptus longhorned borer
Field cricket sp.
Flour beetle
Fruit fly spp.
Glasswing butterfly
Hypoponera opacior ant
Grape borer
Green lacewing
Hen flea
House fly
Ichneumon wasp sp.
Japanese scarab beetle
Larch bud moth
Large milkweed bug
Large white
Leek moth
Long-legged fly spp.
Mazarine blue
Mexican white (butterfly)
Midge sp.
Migratory locust
Monarch butterfly
Narrow-winged damselfly spp.
Parsnip leaf miner
Peach moth
Pomace fly
Queen butterfly
Red ant sp.
Red flour beetle
Rice moth
Reindeer warble fly (Hypoderma tarandi)
Rose chafer (Macrodactylus subspinosus)
Rove beetle spp.
Scarab beetle (melolonthine)
Screwworm fly
Southeastern blueberry bee
Southern green stink bug
Southern masked chafer
Southern one-year canegrub
Spreadwinged damselfly spp.
Spruce budworm moth
Stable fly sp.
Stag beetle spp.
Tsetse fly
Tropical tasar silkmoth
Vine moth
Water boatman bug
Water strider spp.

Other invertebrates

Blood-fluke
Box crab
Harvestman sp.
Hawaiian orb-weaver (spider)
Incirrate octopus spp.
 Deep Sea Octopii
Jumping spiders
Mite sp.
Spiny-headed worm

See also

 Against Nature?, an exhibit at the University of Oslo's Natural History Museum that took place until 19 August 2007.
 Anthropomorphism
 Behavioral ecology is the study of the ecological and evolutionary basis for animal behavior
 Biodiversity
 Bioethics
 Biology and sexual orientation
 Ethology is the scientific study of animal behavior, and a branch of zoology; cognitive ethology fuses cognitive science and classical ethology to observe animals under more-or-less natural conditions
 Evolutionary biology
 
 Innate bisexuality
 Sexual selection

Bibliography

 
 Bagemihl, Bruce (1999). Biological Exuberance: Animal Homosexuality and Natural Diversity. St. Martin's Press 
 Caramagno, Thomas C  (2002). Irreconcilable Differences? Intellectual Stalemate in the Gay Rights Debate; Praeger/Greenwood, .
 Cooper, J.B. "An Exploratory Study on African Lions" in Comparative Psychology Monographs 17:1-48.
 Cziko, Gary (2000) The Things We Do: Using the Lessons of Bernard and Darwin to Understand the What, How, and Why of Our Behavior; MIT Press, .
 de Waal, Frans B. M. (2001) The Ape and The Sushi Master: Cultural Reflections by a Primatologist; Basic Books (chapter Bonobos and Fig Leaves).
 Dunkle, S.W. (1991), "Head damage from mating attempts in dragonflies (Odonata:Anisoptera)". Entomological News 102, pp. 37–41. Retrieved on 16 June 2010.
 Eaton, R. L. (1974). "The Biology and Social Behavior of Reproduction in the Lion" in Eaton, ed. The World's Cats, vol. II; pp. 3–58; Seattle.
 Forger, Nancy G., Laurence G. Frank, S. Marc Breedlove, Stephen E. Glickman (6 December 1998). "Sexual Dimorphism of Perineal Muscles and Motoneurons in Spotted Hyenas"; The Journal of Comparative Neurology, Volume 375, Issue 2, Pages 333 - 343. Retrieved 11 September 2007.
 
 Goudarzi, Sara (16 November 2006). "Gay Animals Out of the Closet?: First-ever Museum Display Shows 51 Species Exhibiting Homosexuality". MSNBC. Retrieved on 12 September 2007.
 
 Holekamp, Kay E. (2003). Research: Spotted Hyena - Introduction and Overview. Michigan State University, Department of Zoology]. Retrieved 16 June 2010.
 Kick, Russ (2001). You Are Being Lied to: The Disinformation Guide to Media Distortion, Historical Whitewashes and Cultural Myths. The Disinformation Company, . Retrieved on 18 November 2007.
 
 
 News-medical.net (23 October 2006). "1,500 Animal Species Practice Homosexuality" Retrieved on 10 September 2007.
 Poiani, Aldo (2010). Animal Homosexuality: A Biosocial Perspective. Cambridge University Press.
 Roselli, Charles E., Kay Larkin, John A. Resko, John N. Stellflug and Fred Stormshak (2004). "The Volume of a Sexually Dimorphic Nucleus in the Ovine Medial Preoptic Area/Anterior Hypothalamus Varies with Sexual Partner Preference". Endocrinology, Department of Physiology and Pharmacology, Oregon Health & Science University (C.E.R., K.L., J.A.R.), Portland, Oregon; Department of Animal Sciences, Oregon State University (F.S.), Corvallis, Oregon; and Agricultural Research Service, United States Sheep Experiment Station (J.N.S.), Dubois, Idaho, Vol. 145, No. 2. Retrieved on 10 September 2007.
 Roughgarden, Joan (2004). Evolutions Rainbow: Diversity, Gender and Sexuality in Nature and People; University of California Press, Berkeley, pages p. 13-183.
 Schaller, G. B. (1972). The Serengeti Lion; University of Chicago Press.
 Smith, Dinitia (7 February 2004). "Love That Dare Not Squeak Its Name" New York Times. Retrieved on 10 September 2007. Reprinted as "Central Park Zoo's Gay Penguins Ignite Debate", San Francisco Chronicle.
 Sommer, Volker & Paul L. Vasey (2006). Homosexual Behaviour in Animals, An Evolutionary Perspective. Cambridge University Press, Cambridge; ISBN 0521864461.
 Srivastav, Suvira (15–31 December 2001). "Lion, Without Lioness" 
 Stein, Edward (1999) The Mismeasure of Desire: The Science, Theory, and Ethics of Sexual Orientation; Oxford University Press, US; .
 Tatarnic, Nikolai J., Gerasimos Cassis, Dieter F. Hochuli; 22 March 2006 "Traumatic insemination in the plant bug genus Coridromius Signoret (Heteroptera: Miridae)" Biology Letters Journal Volume 2, Number 1, pg 58-61: Royal Society Publishing; Retrieved 16 June 2010.
 Terry, Jennifer (2000) "'Unnatural Acts' In Nature: The Scientific Fascination with Queer Animals"; GLQ: A Journal of Lesbian and Gay Studies (6(2):151-193; OI:10.1215/10642684-6-2-151); Duke University Press.
 Utzeri, C. & C. Belfiore (1990): "Anomalous tandems in Odonata". Fragmenta Entomologica 22(2), pp. 271–288.  Retrieved 11 September 2007.
 Vasey, Paul L. (1995), "Homosexual Behaviour in Primates: A Review of Evidence and Theory"; International Journal of Primatology 16: p 173-204.
 
 Zimmer, Carl (2000); Parasite Rex: Inside the Bizarre World of Nature's Most Dangerous Creatures; Simon and Schuster, . Retrieved 18 November 2007.

References

 
Animals
Homosexual